DN Capital is an international venture capital firm headquartered in London that invests in technology companies. It was founded in 2000 by Nenad Marovac and Steve Schlenker, two Harvard Business School classmates.

Investments and exits
DN Capital has raised approximately $600 million. Among other roles, the firm looks to help US companies enter the European market.

The firm's notable exits include:

 Shazam (acquired by Apple for approximately $400 million)
 Datanomic (acquired by Oracle)
 Quandoo (acquired by Japan's Recruit Holdings for $219 million)
 Kana (acquired by Verint Systems for $514 million)
 Apsmart (acquired by Thomson Reuters)
 Endeca (acquired by Oracle for $1.1 billion)
 Purplebricks

Awards
DN Capital was awarded the Best Venture Fund of the Year at the 7th annual Private Equity Exchange Awards in Paris in 2016. Nenad Marovac was awarded the Investor of the Year award at the 14th annual Investor Allstars Awards in London in 2016. In 2017 DN Capital featured as one of the top performing Europe-based venture capital funds in the Preqin awards.

References

External links
DN Capital (company website)

Venture capital firms of the United Kingdom